The 1981 English cricket season was the 82nd in which the County Championship had been an official competition. A change of sponsorship ended the Gillette Cup and the knockout competition became the NatWest Trophy, which lasted for twenty years. Australia toured England to compete for the Ashes and England won the series 3–1. Nottinghamshire won a close struggle for the County Championship title, defeating Sussex by two points.

Honours
County Championship - Nottinghamshire
NatWest Trophy - Derbyshire
Sunday League - Essex
Benson & Hedges Cup - Somerset
Minor Counties Championship - Durham
Second XI Championship - Hampshire II 
Wisden - Terry Alderman, Allan Border, Richard Hadlee, Javed Miandad, Rod Marsh

Test Series

Sri Lankan tour
The second tour of England by the Sri Lankan team took place in 1981. Sri Lanka had not yet achieved Test status.  The team played 13 first-class matches and 11 of these were drawn.  In their other two games, the Sri Lankans won one and lost one.

County Championship

NatWest Trophy

Benson & Hedges Cup

Sunday League

References

External links
 CricketArchive match lists

Further reading
 Playfair Cricket Annual 1982
 Wisden Cricketers' Almanack 1982

English cricket seasons in the 20th century
English Cricket Season, 1981
Cricket season